South Florida State College is a public college in Florida with campuses in Highlands, DeSoto and Hardee counties.  It is part of the Florida College System.

South Florida State College was founded in 1965 and serves around 16,000 students a year. The  Highlands Campus is located two miles (3 km) south of Avon Park, Florida. The college is on an isthmus, bounded on the north by Lake Lelia, to the south by Lake Glenada, and to the west by U.S. Highway 27.  It is a public college offering college credit certificates, career certificates, and associate degrees in over 60 fields of study as well as several bachelor's degrees. Through its University Center, the college partners with other four-year colleges and universities to offer selected bachelor's and master's degrees. Specialized courses are geared for adult education needs and course work is offered through a combination of traditional classroom and distance learning instruction. An athletic program fields teams in women's volleyball, women's softball, women's cross country, and men's baseball.

History 
In 1960, efforts began to open a junior college in Avon Park.  In 1965, the college was founded as South Florida Junior College.  A Highlands-Hardee Junior College Advisory Committee was appointed by the Florida State Board of Education.  Dr. William A. Stallard was appointed as the first president of the college.  The first term of college began in temporary quarters in Avon Park on Aug. 22, 1966.  The first term had a full-time faculty of 14, serving 164 full-time students and 119 part-time and evening students.

The college immediately began expansion of its programs and even had a basketball team in its first year of existence.  In 1968, the college became fully accredited by the state, the first junior college to gain full accreditation in less than three years.  That same year, a vocational technical program was started and groundbreaking ceremonies were held on the Highlands Campus's current site.

In January 1970, permanent facilities for the college's staff were completed and the staff was moved there.  In 1974, the vocational buildings, a bookstore, and a student center were constructed.  The school's auditorium was completed in 1978, and in 1982 the gymnasium was completed.

In January 1984, Dr. Stallard retired as president, and Dr. Richard Morley was named interim president. In March 1984, the District Board of Trustees renamed the college South Florida Community College.  Two months later, the South Florida Community College Foundation held its first meeting.  The Foundation's goal was to offer grants and scholarships to students.  In July 1984, Dr. Catherine Cornelius became the second president of South Florida Community College.

In late 1984, the DeSoto and Lake Placid centers of the college were opened.  The DeSoto Center first had three classrooms and an office.  Today the DeSoto Campus is housed in a large modern building. The DeSoto Center originally had three classrooms and an office in the Fountain Plaza. A new campus was built in 2003 with much more space. The Lake Placid Center was established in a former public school and now consists of five buildings.

In 1988, the Hotel Jacaranda was acquired.  The hotel was built in the 1920s and was a distinguished hotel for many years. Babe Ruth, George Burns and Gracie Allen, among others, stayed there.  The hotel serves as a residence facility for South Florida State College students and offers hotel accommodations and a restaurant to the public.

Telecourses were first offered in 1992. In 1993, the Public Service Academy was opened. This unit provides training and education in criminal justice, emergency medical services, and law endorsement.

In 1999, the Crews Center was opened.  In 2002, the Museum of Florida Art and Culture and the University Center, which houses the college's bachelor's and advanced degree programs, were opened.  Also, that year Dr. Norman L. Stephens Jr. became the third president of the college.

In 2003, the Dental Education Center opened.  The Hardee and DeSoto campuses opened.

On July 1, 2012, the college officially changed its name to South Florida State College.

On July 1, 2013, Dr. Thomas C. Leitzel became South Florida State College's fourth president.

Campuses and centers 

 The Highlands Campus, between Avon Park and Sebring, Florida.
 The Lake Placid Center, in Lake Placid, Florida.
 The Hardee Campus, at Bowling Green, Florida.
 The DeSoto Campus, at Arcadia, Florida.
 The Hotel Jacaranda, in downtown Avon Park.
 The Crews Center, in Avon Park.

The Highlands, Hardee, and DeSoto campuses and Lake Placid Center offer a variety of vocational and academic programs.

The Jacaranda Hotel serves a variety of purposes. It has dormitory facilities for students and commercial hotel rooms for guests. The Hotel Jacaranda Dining Room is a restaurant where food service students learn culinary and food management skills. Finally, several administrative offices are located in the Hotel, and remaining office space is leased to business tenants.

The Crews Center has facilities for commercial driving students and plumbing and electrical apprenticeship students.

Cultural Performances
In addition to its role as the only post-secondary institution in the district, 'South Florida State College serves as a cultural focal point, providing quality entertainment to Florida's Heartland since 1984. The six performance series offered are the Artist, Matinee, Jazz, Kaleidoscope, Summer, and Young People's Theatre. Performances are held on the Highlands Campus in the theatre for the Performing Arts and the 245-seat University Center Auditorium. Past performers have included Engelbert Humperdinck, Bob Newhart, Marie Osmond, and the Smothers Brothers.

Museum of Florida Art and Culture
Since 2002, the Highlands Campus has been home to the SFSC Museum of Florida Art and Culture, which is open from October through May, Wednesdays, Thursdays, and Fridays, 12:30-4:30 p.m.  The museum provides an exhibition venue for contemporary Florida regional artists and preserves Florida's history and heritage through its art. MOFAC also serves as a repository for the discoveries unearthed by members of the Kissimmee Valley Archaeological and Historical Conservancy.

The museum also oversees the Wildflower Wayside Shrine Trail, an ongoing exhibition in which science, art, and the natural world come together. This self-guided walking trail explores pristine scrubland on the Highlands Campus and contains six shrine boxes created by artist Mollie Doctrow to honor the endangered plant species found on the Lake Wales Ridge, the oldest ecosystem in the southeastern United States. This project was made possible by a grant from the U.S. Institute of Museum and Library Services.

Academics 
South Florida State College serves around 16,000 students a year. It is a public college offering college credit certificates, career certificates, and associate degrees in more than 60 fields of study. The college also offers selected bachelor's degrees and has articulation agreements for students to pursue select bachelor's, master's, and a doctoral degrees in partnership with four-year colleges and universities. Specialized courses are geared for adult education needs and coursework is offered through a mix of traditional classroom and distance learning instruction.

The college is accredited by the Southern Association of Colleges and Schools Commission on Colleges.

Student life

Sport 
The college fields teams in women's volleyball, women's cross country, women's softball, and men's baseball, which are named the Panthers.

Notable people

References

External links 
 

 
1965 establishments in Florida
Buildings and structures in DeSoto County, Florida
Buildings and structures in Hardee County, Florida
Buildings and structures in Highlands County, Florida
Education in DeSoto County, Florida
Education in Hardee County, Florida
Education in Highlands County, Florida
Educational institutions established in 1965
Florida College System
Universities and colleges accredited by the Southern Association of Colleges and Schools
Florida Native American Heritage Trail
Avon Park, Florida